Maudihan is a village in the Rohtas District of Bihar state, India. It is 14 km north of Dehri-On-Sone, an industrial city. It is located on Dehri-Patna road. It is also referred to as 'Maudiha'.

Maudihan Village 
Maudihan is surrounded by cultivated lands from all directions. In east it has boundary with Sone River. August to November this village will be surrounded by green paddy crops. During wheat season this village can be found in between wheat fields. Such a picturesque and scenic village is rare and Maudihan holds its glory to represent it.  Village was founded by four brothers who migrated from Baisadih village near Piro. They founded the village along with other caste and community people.  Every inch of the land of this village is cultivated land. Soil of land is so soft that you can take a roll over on land when it is ploughed.

Geography 
Maudihan is located at 24°59′53″N 84°14′47″E on global map. Its around 335 ft above sea level. Village is on Dehri-Patna road or more precisely on Dehri-Bikramganj via Nasariganj SH-15 road. From main road this village is connected through concrete road at Dhelabag Lock and at Ayar Kotha. Railway connectivity for this village is at Dehri-On-Sone. In eastern side Sone canal (Arrah line) flows. Sone river bank is around 4 km from the village. Village has orchards in its eastern parts.
Some of the major trees which can be found in this village are Mango, Seesam, eucalyptus, Siris or Shireesh (Albizia lebbeck), Mahua, Neem, Bamboo etc. Village has a road (muddy road which starts from eastern end passes through the village and comes out in U shape. Village roads are covered with mango trees.

Administrative Details 
Administrative details of Maudihan is as below:

Country - India

State                 - Bihar

Division             - Patna

District             - Rohtas District

District Headquarters - Sasaram

Sub-Division         - Dehri

Block                - Dehri

Police Station       - Darihat (located at Ayar Kotha)

Post office          - Baraon Kala (Via - Darihat)

Pin Code             - 821306

Panchayat            - Baraon (Kala)

Boundary 
Maudihan's boundary:

North - Ganua village

South - Chilbila Village

East - Arrah Line Sone Canal

West - Tiwaridih village

Electoral 
Maudihan comes under Karakat (Lok Sabha constituency) Parliamentary constituency and Dehri Assembly constituency
Electoral statistics as per 2013 electoral list:

Loksabha Area - Karakat (35)

Vidhansabha Area - Dehri (212)

Booth number     - 73 Utkramit Middle School Maudihan

Areas under booth number 73 - Maudihan and Dhelabag Tola

Total number of voters        - 1397

Total number of male voters   - 767

Total number of female voters - 630

Voter list has two parts. 1st part contains house number 1 - 156 of Maudihan village. Voter number 1 to 1244 are in part one which is Maudihan. 2nd part contains house number 1 to 25 of Dhelabag tola. Voter list number 1245 to 1397 are from Dhelabag Tola.

People 
As per census 2011, population of Maudihan village is as below: 

Total Persons - 1708

Total Males   -  923

Total Female  -  785

Total households - 274

Demographics 
There are about 2000 people living here and nowadays more people are displaced to small town and Cities. 60% people are of aged between 60-80 years. In coming day population density will decrease more. People are divided into several casts.

Education 
Primary School:

Maudihan had a primary school since 1948. Name of the school was Govt Primary School Maudihan (राजकीय प्राथमिक विद्यालय मौडिहाँ).
This school got upgraded to middle school and current name of the school is Utkramit Middle School Maudihan (राजकीय उत्क्रमित मध्य विद्यालय मौडिहाँ).

Middle School (Secondary school):

Prior to this middle school, students of the village used to study till 5th standard in local primary school. For middle school (class 6th to class 8th) they had to go to nearby village Chilbila.

High School:
Ashok Kumar Jain High School Darihat
Nearest High school for boys and girls is Darihat around 3.5 km.
Ashok Kumar Jain High School Darihat
This school was established in 1947. This school is a boys school from class 8th to 12th class. Earlier it used to be till 10th standard.

Rampyari Girls High School Darihat
This school till 10+2 is the only school in the vicinity for girls for education till 12th.

College:

For graduation, there are few colleges in Dehri-On-Sone. Many students go to other cities like Arrah, Patna, Ranchi, Hazaribag, New Delhi etc. for higher studies.

History

Events

Hospitals 
There is no government hospital in Maudihan. Nearest PHC (Primary Health Centre) is in Darihat around 3 km from village. Village has a RMP doctor Hadees Ansari. There is a very famous Homeopathic Hospital name “Electro Homeo Clinic” which is for paralysis & Polio patient and this hospital is very famous in region of sahabad

Good clinics and hospitals are available in Dehri-on-Sone and Dalmianagar. There are mainly specialist doctors in Dehri-on-Sone. There is a medical college hospital in Jamuhar. Complicated medical cases are referred to Varanasi.

Festivals 
All the Hindu festivals are celebrated in Maudihan. To name some of the festivals which is celebrated in a grand way are as below: 
New year celebration, Makar Sankranti, Republic day, Saraswati Puja, Mahashivratri, Holi - Fagua, Chaitra Navami (Ramnavami), Rakshabandhan (Shravan Purnima), Krishna Janamastami, Karma Dharma, Independence Day, Navaratri, Dasahara, Diwali, Bhaiyaduj, Govardhan Puja, Devthan, Chhath etc. 
Apart from above mentioned festivals Dhelahan tola celebrates Muharram, Ramjan, Bakrid etc. 
Details of some of the festivals will be updated later.

Temples/religious places 

Shivalay (Shiv mandir)

Devi Mai ka Mandir

Sayar Mai

Mahaveer jee (at Devi mai ka mandir)

Samardhir Baba (Baghaut Baba)

Shiv Mandir at Dhelabag Lock

Shopping 
There are few grocery shops in village itself. Nearby market is Ayar Kotha Bazar. Ayar Kotha Bazar has bi-weekly vegetable market to cloth shops, readymade shops, medical shops, bank, cycle repair, Tyre puncture and lot of eateries.Dehri-On-Sone is the big market place where everything is available. Mostly marketing is done from Dehri-On-Sone and rare occasions its Varanasi.

Olden days Gyanchand Saw shop used to be and later it was Mor Saw, Potan Saw, Shivchand Saw etc. opened the shop for daily usage stuff. Dhelabag Lock also has few shops with tea-snacks and Paan.

Currently there are many shops in village. Sudama Prasad a voluntary retired BSF Jawaan has opened a shop in village with almost everything thing of daily usage stuff available. His investment and profit making inspired others too to open the shop and now there are many such shops.

Agriculture products like Paddy, Rice, wheat are picked up mainly by buyers from village itself but there is a big market in [Dehri-On-Sone].

Agriculture 
This village having Black Soil which is perfect for crops. Major Crops grown here are Rice, Wheat, and gram. Most of the population is dependent on agriculture and it is one of the best place to farming in Bihar. Agriculture is not dependent on rain only because there are three Canals which helps in case of dry or less rain fall. There is a Dam in Dehri- On- Sone which is around 18 Kilo meter from this village where water irrigation system works.

Nearby villages 
Nearby villages which are close to Maudihan are as below. They are written at random order:

Barawn (Kala), Ganua, Gohin, Chilbila, Ayar Kotha, Dhelabag, Darihat, Tiwaridih, Ahraon, Khudraon, Majhiaon, Tarwan (Tandwa), Paduhar(Paruhar), Paruri (Paduri), Sohagi, Mangipur, Taraon, Dhobdihan, Baligaon etc.

References

External links 

Villages in Rohtas district